Abu Mustafa al-Sheibani (born 1959 in al-Nasiriyah) also known as Hamid Thajil Warij al-Attabi or Hamid al-Sheibani is an Iraqi Shi'a leader who commands his own insurgent group and smuggling network known as the Sheibani Network, which became one of the Iraqi Special Groups. An arrest warrant was issued for him by the Central Criminal Court of Iraq on 12 April 2005 with a reward of $200,000 for information leading to his capture. In 2006 he was added to the Iraqi Government's 41 Most-Wanted list. He holds both Iraqi and Iranian nationality because he lived in exile in Iran during Saddam Hussein's rule later returned there to live in Tehran after 2006. In September 2010, after Iraqi Prime Minister Nouri al-Maliki formed a coalition government with Shi'a rebel leader Muqtada al-Sadr, Sheibani was allowed to return to Iraq along with Abu Deraa.

Sheibani was a former member of the Supreme Council for Islamic Revolution in Iraq's Badr Brigades, after the 2003 US-led invasion of Iraq he created an arms smuggling network linked to Iran's Quds Force. The Sheibani network was used to supply Qais Khazali's Khazali Network (also known as Asa'ib Ahl al-Haq or League of the Righteous) and other Special Groups, The group is also itself responsible for numerous attacks against Coalition and Iraqi security forces, in particular British forces in Basra. The Sheibani network is alleged to be responsible for a bombing in July 2005 which killed three British soldiers as well as other attacks. After his return to Iraq in 2010, he joined forces with the Khazali network.

His younger brother Abu Yaser al-Sheibani, which was his second in command, was captured by US forces on April 20, 2007

References

Further reading
Targeting the Iranian "Secret Cells"

1959 births
Badr Brigade members
Living people
Iraqi insurgency (2003–2011)
Iraqi Shia Muslims
Individuals related to Iran Sanctions